The Franklin Knights are a professional, minor league basketball team based in Franklin, Tennessee, United States. In 2010 they competed in the World Basketball Association and went to the championship game.  They were also named the 2010 WBA Team of the Year. The Knights play their home games at the A-Game Sportsplex in Franklin, located just outside Nashville.

References

External links
Franklin Knights

World Basketball Association teams
Basketball teams in Tennessee
2010 establishments in Tennessee
Basketball teams established in 2010